The Raidāk River, also called Wang Chhu or Wong Chhu in Bhutan, is a tributary of the River Brahmaputra, and a trans-boundary river. It flows through Bhutan, India and Bangladesh. It is one of the main river in Alipurduar District, India.

Course

Bhutan
The Wang Chhu, or Raidāk, rises in the Himalayas. In its upper reaches it is also known as the Thimphu Chhu. The main river is a rapid stream, running over a bed of large boulders. Between Thimphu and the confluence with the Paro Chhu, the course of the river is not severely confined but, after leaving the confluence, it runs through a narrow defile between very steep cliffs. It subsequently flows southeast through a comparatively open valley, its course strewn with large boulders against which the water foams violently. It is joined by several small tributaries flowing from nearby mountains. Just above Paro Dzong a considerable feeder, the Ta Chhu, joins it from the left. To the west, the Ha Chhu drains into the Wong Chhu.

West Bengal and Bangladesh

It debouches into the plains in Alipurduar District ( Kamakhyaguri ) and then flows through Cooch Behar district in West Bengal. The Raidak joins with the Brahmaputra at chainage 327 km in Kurigram District in Bangladesh, where it is sometimes referred to Dudhkumar River.

Chukha hydel plant
The 336MW Chukha hydel project, which harnesses the waters of the Wang Chhu or Raidak River, was historically one of the largest single investments undertaken in Bhutan, and it represented a major step toward exploiting the country's huge hydroelectric potential. It was built by India on a turnkey basis, with India providing 60% of the capital in a grant and 40% in a loan at highly concessional terms and conditions. In the arrangement, India receives in turn all the electricity generated from the project in excess of Bhutan’s demand at much cheaper prices than India’s generation cost from alternative sources. Construction started in 1974 and completed in 1986–88.

Tala hydroelectric plant

Tala Hydroelectric Power Station is a run-of-the-river type hydroelectric power station on the Wangchu River in Chukha District, Bhutan. The Tala dam is located about 3 km downstream of Chukha power house.

References

Rivers of Bhutan
Rivers of West Bengal
Tributaries of the Brahmaputra River
International rivers of Asia
Rivers of Bangladesh
Rivers of India
Rivers of Rangpur Division